Carol Gardipe (also known as Carol Nelson, Carol Metcalf and Carol Metcalf-Gardipe; born 1929; Penobscot/Passamaquoddy) is an American geologist, whose career has included positions with the United States Geological Survey (USGS), National Oceanic and Atmospheric Administration, and roles in higher education as a professor and administrator. She is one of the seven founders of the American Indian Science and Engineering Society (AISES).

Education 
Gardipe first attended the University of Connecticut, with a field semester at the University of Wyoming, Laramie. She earned her BA in Geology from University of Connecticut., She taught for a time at Colby College. Gardipe attended graduate school at the University of New Mexico studying geography and natural resources.

Career 
After earning her BA, she worked in Newport News, VA and then Washington DC, and on field mapping teams in the Southwest for the USGS. After completing her graduate work, Gardipe and Bob Whitman  launched and directed the Native American Program at the College of Engineering (NAPCOE) for two years, the first program in the country for American Indian Engineers at University of New Mexico. During the same time she worked with the National Research Council Committee on Minorities in Engineering. In 1976,  Gardipe with Al Qöyawayma, and Arnold Anderson formed the American Indian Engineering Council (AIEC).  She worked as a marine geologist at National Oceanic and Atmospheric Administration.

In 1977, brought together by the National Academy of Engineering, Gardipe along with Arnold Anderson, Al Qëyawayma, George Thomas, Jerry Elliot, and Jim Shorty founded the National Society of American Indian Engineers now known as American Indian Science and Engineering Society (AISES).  Gardipe served on the first Board of Directors for AISES. She was also active in the American Association for the Advancement of Science.

In 1981, she was guest speaker and was a member of the screening committee for the Science and Self-Determination program at University Colorado Boulder. The aim of the program was to acquaint American Indian high school students with first hand information about careers in science and to provide academic support that would improve performance on college entrance tests so these students would be able to access to careers in science and/or math at the university level.

Personal life 
In 1983, Gardipe was involved in a serious auto accident that has limited her activities. She resides in Santa Fe, NM.

Awards and recognition 
Gardipe is a Fellow of the Geological Society of America. In 2003, she received the Ely S. Parker Award, the highest honor of the American Indian Science and Engineering Society.

References 

1929 births
Living people
20th-century American women scientists
20th-century Native Americans
American women geologists
Colby College alumni
Fellows of the Geological Society of America
Native American scientists
Native American women academics
American women academics
Native American academics
University of Wyoming alumni
20th-century Native American women
21st-century American women
Native American women scientists